Woodborough is a village and civil parish in the Gedling district, in the county of Nottinghamshire, England. It is located 7 miles north-east of Nottingham. According to the 2001 census it had a population of 1,872. rising slightly to 1,872 at the 2011 census.

St. Swithun's Church, Woodborough is a 13th-century tower with a 14th-century chancel. Woodborough was a framework-knitting village, and some two-storey cottages with ground-floor knitter's windows remain at the junction of Main Street and Shelt Hill.

Woodborough also has a primary school called Woodborough Woods Foundation CofE Primary School, where 200+ students attend at any one time.

Notable people
John Story (1812–1872), cricketer

Bus services

Nottingham City Transport

 47: Nottingham – Mapperley – Lambley – Woodborough 
 46: Nottingham – Mapperley – Woodborough - Lambley

External links

 The Woodborough Web – What's on in Woodborough
 Premiere Travel
 Woodborough Heritage site
 Woodborough Parish Council
 Woodborough Community Association

References

 
Villages in Nottinghamshire
Civil parishes in Nottinghamshire
Gedling